Stephen P. Randolph is an American historian who served as Director of the Office of the Historian of the United States Department of State from 2012 to 2017.

Education
Randolph graduated from the United States Air Force Academy in 1974 and then earned a MA in History of Science from the Johns Hopkins University in 1975 and a Ph.D from George Washington University in 2005.

Career
Previously to his arrival at the State Department, Randolph worked at the Eisenhower School of National Defense from 1997 to 2011 in various roles. Before working at the National Defense University, Randolph had spent 27 years in the U.S. Air Force, commanding a squadron during Operation Desert Storm and becoming a colonel by his retirement from service in 2001.

Randolph is the author of Powerful and Brutal Weapons: Nixon, Kissinger, and the Easter Offensive, published in 2007, and is the recipient of the 2018 Roger Trask Award which honours the work of historians that "reflects the unique importance of federal history".

References

External links

Living people
Johns Hopkins University alumni
Columbian College of Arts and Sciences alumni
21st-century American historians
21st-century American male writers
United States Air Force Academy alumni
United States Department of State officials
National Defense University faculty
United States Air Force officers
United States Air Force personnel of the Gulf War
Year of birth missing (living people)
George Washington University alumni
American male non-fiction writers